Pearls Before Swine may refer to:

 "Pearls before swine", a phrase from Matthew 7:6 in the Bible

Literature
 Pearls Before Swine (comics), a comic strip by Stephan Pastis
 Coroner's Pidgin or Pearls Before Swine, a novel in the Albert Campion series by Margery Allingham
 God Bless You, Mr. Rosewater or Pearls Before Swine, a novel by Kurt Vonnegut

Music
 Pearls Before Swine (band), an American psychedelic folk band formed by Tom Rapp
 "Pearls Before Swine", a 1993 song by Coldcut from Philosophy
 "Pearls Before Swine", a song by Corrosion of Conformity from Deliverance
 "Pearls before the Swine", a song by Machine Head from Unto the Locust
 "Pearls B4 the Swine", a song by Prince from One Nite Alone...

Other uses
 Pearls Before Swine (film), a 1999 Australian film starring Boyd Rice
 Pearls Before Swine (musical), a 1986 Australian musical by Dennis Watkins and Chris Harriott

See also
 Casting Pearls (album), an album by VOTA
 Casting Pearls, an album by Melys
 "Casting Pearls Before the Swine", a bonus song by Yngwie Malmsteen from Facing the Animal
 Peärls Before Swïne Experience, a classical music ensemble